is a song recorded by Japanese duo Yoasobi from their second EP, The Book 2 (2021). It was released digitally on January 6, 2021, the same date as the duo's debut extended play (EP), The Book, through Sony Music Entertainment Japan. As an opening theme for the second season of the anime television series Beastars, "Kaibutsu" is about a carnivore trying to coexist with herbivores in a cruel world, based on Jibun no Mune ni Jibun no Mimi o Oshi Atete, written by the anime's writer Paru Itagaki.

Commercially, "Kaibutsu" peaked at number two on the Billboard Japan Hot 100, and number 87 on the Global 200. The double A-side CD single with "Yasashii Suisei", released on March 24, debuted at number two on the Oricon Singles Chart with 24,000 copies. The song earned four wins for Song of the Year (Japan) and Best 5 Songs at the 36th Japan Gold Disc Award in both download and streaming categories. It was featured on Time 10 Best Songs of 2021 list, becoming the only Japanese song on it. Later, the song was included on the duo's second EP The Book 2. The English version of the song, titled "Monster", was released on July 30.

Background and release

On November 5, Yoasobi announced to writing and singing the opening theme song for the second season of the anime television series Beastars, titled "Kaibutsu". The song was based on the novel , written by Paru Itagaki, who also wrote and illustrated the manga.

"Kaibutsu" was released to digital music and streaming platforms January 6, 2021. The song was released as a double A-side CD single, together with "Yasashii Suisei" on March 24. The single came in 2 versions: limited edition (anime edition) and fan club limited edition for members of "Club Yoasobi", Yoasobi's official fan club website. Both versions included the original songs, TV size version songs, and non-credit opening and ending video from Beastars. The fan club limited edition also included the acoustic session of "Tabun" and "Ano Yume o Nazotte". Later, the song was included on their second EP The Book 2, released on December 1.

Yoasobi announced to release the English version of "Kaibutsu", titled "Monster" on July 30, alongside the accompanying music video, and aired the full song for the first time on their radio show Yoasobi's All Night Nippon X on July 27. It is the duo's third English song after "Into the Night, and "RGB". Later, the song was included on the duo's first English-language EP E-Side, release on November 12.

Lyrics and composition

"Kaibutsu" is an upbeat fast-paced song with a catchy chorus, tells about a carnivore trying to coexist with herbivores in a cruel world. Although this idea is unrealistic, it still protects the herbivore. To adhere to its ideals, it decides to become strong and confront the whole world. The song is in the key of A-flat minor on the verses and break, C-sharp minor on the first chorus, D-flat major on the bridge and in D minor in the final chorus, and is at 170 beats per minute with a running time of 3 minutes and 26 seconds.

Critical reception

American magazine Time ranked "Kaibutsu" number five on its list of the 10 Best Songs of 2021, becoming the only song from a Japanese act on the list, and being described as a "seamless" integration of "a giant pop hook with furious math rock riffs", "jazzy chromatic runs", and "a seismic EDM-esque drop". Additionally, critics said that the song gave "yearning", and "cinematic nature" and was "wholly unsurprised" to be served as the theme song to the anime Beastars.

Commercial performance

"Kaibutsu" debuted at number 14 on the Billboard Japan Hot 100 of January 18, 2021 and peaked at number 2 on the chart of March 31, due to releasing the CD single. The song also peaked at number 87 on the Billboard Global 200 and number 39 on the Billboard Global Excl. US of January 30.

The CD single "Kaibutsu / Yasashii Suisei" debuted and peaked at number 2 on the Oricon Singles Chart for the chart issue date of April 5, 2021, selling 23,761 copies, and also number 2 on the Billboard Japan Top Single Sales chart, selling 27,275 copies for the chart issue date of March 31, 2021.

Music video

The music video "Kaibutsu" was premiered on January 13, 2021, directed by Rina Mitsuzumi, with 2D animation by Kaori Onishi and motion graphics by Jun Matsuda and Cafuu. The music video depicts the conflict and determination of the main character, Legoshi, that wears a sense of speed and darkness. The music video surpassed 100 million views on June 22 and 200 million views on April 4, 2022.

Live performance and cover

Yoasobi premiered the live performance "Kaibutsu" for the first time in their first online concert—Keep Out Theater on February 14, 2021, where the song was the number fifth. The duo gave a television debut performance of the song at the 63rd Japan Record Awards on December 30, alongside "Yasashii Suisei", and "Moshi mo Inochi ga Egaketara".

On February 4, 2021, A cover of "Kaibutsu" by Japanese singer Masayuki Suzuki was released as a promotional single from his 35th anniversary cover greatest hit album Discover Japan DX, scheduled for release on February 23.

Accolades

Track listing

Digital download and streaming
 – 3:26

Digital download and streaming (English version)
"Monster" – 3:26

CD single

CD
"Kaibutsu" – 3:26
"Yasashii Suisei" – 3:35
"Kaibutsu" (TV Size version) – 1:30
"Yasashii Suisei" (TV Size version) – 1:26
DVD (limited edition)
"TV anime Beastars Season 2 opening non-credit video/Yoasobi "Kaibutsu""
"TV anime Beastars Season 2 ending non-credit video/Yoasobi "Yasashii Suisei""
Blu-ray (fanclub limited edition)
"TV anime Beastars Season 2 opening non-credit video/Yoasobi "Kaibutsu""
"TV anime Beastars Season 2 ending non-credit video/Yoasobi "Yasashii Suisei""
"Tabun" (acoustic session)
"Ano Yume o Nazotte" (acoustic session)

Credits and personnel

Credits adapted from The Book 2 liner notes and YouTube.

Song
 Ayase – producer, songwriter
 Ikura – vocals
 AssH – guitar
 Paru Itagaki – based story writer
 Takayuki Saitō – vocal recording
 Masahiko Fukui – mixing
 Kazuyoshi Saitō – cover artwork design

Music video
 Rina Mitsuzumi – director
 Jun Matsuda – motion graphics
 Cafuu – motion graphics
 Kaori Onishi – 2D animation
 AI Rinna – design supporter

Charts

Weekly charts

Monthly charts

Year-end charts

Certifications

Release history

References

External links
 
 English translation of I Press My Own Ear to My Chest

2021 singles
2021 songs
Animated series theme songs
Anime songs
Japanese-language songs
Songs about monsters
Sony Music Entertainment Japan singles
Yoasobi songs